Dove is the third studio album by American alternative rock band Belly, released on May 4, 2018. It was released twenty-three years after Belly's previous album King (1995) and their subsequent disbandment. The band reformed in 2016, and, following a successful reunion tour, chose to crowdfund a new album which would become Dove.

Dove continued the band's tradition of releasing albums with four-letter word titles.

Track listing

Charts

References

2018 albums
Belly (band) albums
Albums produced by Paul Q. Kolderie
Crowdfunded albums